Butuanon may refer to:
The Butuanon language, an Austronesian language and member of the Visayan language family, spoken in the Philippines
The Butuanon people, speakers of the Butuanon language
Butuan and its residents, in the Agusan del Norte province of the Philippines